Okere District is one of the thirty-three districts in Eastern Region, Ghana. Originally it was formerly part of the then-larger Akuapim North District in 1988, which was created from the former Akuapim District Council; until it was elevated to municipal district assembly status on 15 March 2012 to become Akuapim North Municipal District. 

However on 15 March 2018, the northeast part of the district was split off to create Okere District; thus the remaining part has been retained as Akuapim North Municipal District. The municipality is located in the southeast part of Eastern Region and has Adukrom as its capital town.

List of settlements

Towns 
The Traditional Area comprises seven main towns is Abiriw, Dawu, Awukugua, Adukrom, Apirede, Aseseeso and Abonse and over one hundred and fifty smaller towns and villages which residents hail from one of the seven main towns. The language spoken amongst the indigenes of the area is Kyerepon.

References

Districts of the Eastern Region (Ghana)